San Paolo (Italian for "Saint Paul") is a comune in the Province of Brescia, in the Italian region Lombardy.

References